Charlie Sadler (born May 6, 1949) is a former American football coach. He served as the head football coach at Northern Illinois University from 1991 to 1995, compiling  arecord of 18–37. Sadler was the defensive ends coach at Texas Tech University from 2003 to 2009. He previously held coaching positions at the University of Oklahoma, the University of Missouri, and Iowa State University.

Head coaching record

References

External links
 Texas Tech profile

1949 births
Living people
Iowa State Cyclones football coaches
Missouri Tigers football coaches
Northeastern State RiverHawks football players
Northern Illinois Huskies football coaches
Oklahoma Sooners football coaches
Texas Tech Red Raiders football coaches
High school football coaches in Texas
University of Arkansas alumni
People from Carrollton, Texas